The Samsung Galaxy Grand is a smartphone developed by Samsung Electronics, first announced on December 18, 2012. The phone has a dual core Cortex-A9 1.2 GHz processor and a RAM of 1 GB, with an internal memory of 8 GB which can be extended to another 64 GB by use of microSD cards. The device also supports internet connectivity through 2G and 3G, apart from Wi-Fi. Navigation systems including A-GPS and GLONASS with Google Maps. The phone runs on the Android 4.1.2 Jelly Bean OS, with Samsung releasing updates up to 4.2.2. However, custom ROMs are available up to Android 7.1.2 Nougat.

The Galaxy Grand features an 8 MP rear camera that is capable of high-resolution photos and video capture. Both cameras are capable of Full HD video recording at 1920×1080p at 30 frames per second. The camera comes with an LED flash that is capable of illuminating your subjects quite adequately even in low light conditions. The secondary front-facing camera is composed of an upgraded 2 MP camera. Autofocus, Geo-tagging, Touch Focus and Face Detection are some of the advanced features supported by the phone, as well as an image stabilizer and smile detector, and basic image editor.

The Samsung Galaxy Grand is powered by a 2100 mAh LiPo that is capable of lasting up to 10 hours. The  TFT WVGA, multi-touch screen is capable of 16 million colors.

Features 
 5-inch display, 800×480 px WVGA, 187 ppi pixel density
 Dual SIM (GT-I9082)
 1 GB RAM (860 MB usable)
 8 GB internal memory (4 GB user available)
 8-megapixels primary camera, 2-megapixels secondary camera
 1080p @30fps full HD video recording. Geo-tagging, touch focus, face and smile detection, image stabilization
 Android 4.1.2 (Jelly Bean); 
 Bluetooth, Wi-Fi, 3G, Wi-Fi Direct, Hotspot
 TouchWiz UI, Samsung Apps, Play Store
 Accelerometer, gyro, proximity, compass, GPS and GLONASS support
 Messaging: SMS (threaded view), MMS, Email
 Stereo FM radio with RDS (Global)
 DMB Mobile TV(Korea)
 Google Play, Google Search, Maps, Gmail, YouTube, Calendar, Google Talk, Picasa
 Voice Memo/Dial/Commands

In August 2013, Samsung announced that the Galaxy Grand would receive the Android 4.2.2 OS update. This update was first launched in Russia, while owners in India received the update in early September. This update also brought an updated version of Touchwiz. On February 20, 2014, Samsung Poland announced that Galaxy Grand is among 14 Samsung devices that will receive the Android 4.4 KitKat upgrade.

Variant

Overclocking 
The dual-core Cortex A9 runs at a speed of 1.2 GHz by default, but it can be overclocked to 1.3 GHz without the need of a custom kernel. This can be effected by rooting and then using a CPU clock speed modification app.

Special editions
In South Korea, Samsung launched a variant of the product with a quad-core CPU at a much lower price. In India, Samsung also launched the Samsung Galaxy Grand with a free flip cover, 50GB Dropbox Storage, free My Services and a Dual-SIM slot.

Reception
The Economic Times reviewed the Galaxy Grand and said in their verdict: "Great for multimedia and comes with the promise of reliable after-sales service; but otherwise isn't worth twice the cost of budget phablets with similar specs."

References

External links 
 Official websites in India and Philippines

Android (operating system) devices
Galaxy Grand
Galaxy Grand
Mobile phones introduced in 2013